This is a list of seasons played by Bnei Yehuda Football Club in Israeli and European football, from 1940 (when the club joined the Israeli football league system) to the most recent completed season. It details the club's achievements in major competitions and the top scorers for each season. Top scorers in bold were also the top scorers in the Israeli league that season. Records of minor cup competitions, such as the Lilian Cup and the Israel Super Cup are not included due to them being considered of less importance than the State Cup and the Toto Cup.

The club has won the League Championship once, the State Cup twice and the Toto Cup twice, as well as winning the second division six times.

History
Bnei Yehuda Tel Aviv was formed in January 1936 in the Hatikva Quarter of Tel Aviv. The club was promoted to the top division for the first time in 1959, and as of 2016 played 50 seasons in the top division.

Seasons

Key

 P = Played
 W = Games won
 D = Games drawn
 L = Games lost
 F = Goals for
 A = Goals against
 Pts = Points
 Pos = Final position

 Leumit = Liga Leumit (National League)
 Alef = Liga Alef (A League)
 Artzit = Liga Artzit (Nationwide League)
 Al = Liga Al (Premier League)
 Bet = Liga Bet (B League)
 Gimel = Liga Gimel (C League)

 F = Final
 Group = Group stage
 QF = Quarter-finals
 QR1 = First Qualifying Round
 QR2 = Second Qualifying Round
 QR3 = Third Qualifying Round
 QR4 = Fourth Qualifying Round
 QPO = Play-off round
 RInt = Intermediate Round

 R1 = Round 1
 R2 = Round 2
 R3 = Round 3
 R4 = Round 4
 R5 = Round 5
 R6 = Round 6
 R7 = Round 7
 R8 = Round 8
 R9 = Round 9
 SF = Semi-finals
 dnp =Did not participated

Footnotes

Notes and references

Bnei Yehuda Tel Aviv F.C.
 
Bnei Yehuda